The Trans-Alaska Pipeline Authorization Act of 1973 is a United States federal law signed by US President Richard Nixon on November 16, 1973, that authorized the building of an oil pipeline connecting the North Slope of Alaska to Port Valdez. Specifically, it halted all legal challenges, which were filed primarily by environmental activists, against the construction of the pipeline. In accordance with Nixon's request, the act contains no amendments allowing for federal and state agencies such as the Environmental Protection Agency, the Alaska Department of Natural Resources, or the Alaska Department of Fish and Game to regulate the construction of the pipeline.

The act was supported by Alaska's congressmen, Don Young, Ted Stevens and Mike Gravel; however, since they all lacked major seniority, the act was introduced by long-time Washington Senator Henry M. Jackson. The act partially helped in solving the world-wide 1973 oil crisis. 

The act is found in Title 43, Section 1651 of the United States Code. The Trans-Alaska Pipeline System was eventually built as a result of the act.

References

External links
Text of the act

1973 in law
Trans-Alaska Pipeline System
United States federal energy legislation